Estefania Priscila García Mendoza (born 13 May 1988, Portoviejo) is an Ecuadorian judoka. At the 2012 Summer Olympics she competed in the Women's 63 kg, but was defeated in the second round.

She competed in the women's 63 kg division at the 2016 Summer Olympics in Rio de Janeiro. She defeated Mamadama Bangoura of Guinea in the first round and was then defeated by Kathrin Unterwurzacher of Austria in the next round. She was the flag bearer for Ecuador during the Parade of Nations.

She represented Ecuador at the 2020 Summer Olympics.

References

External links
 

Ecuadorian female judoka
Living people
Olympic judoka of Ecuador
Judoka at the 2012 Summer Olympics
Judoka at the 2016 Summer Olympics
1988 births
Pan American Games gold medalists for Ecuador
Pan American Games medalists in judo
Judoka at the 2015 Pan American Games
People from Portoviejo
South American Games bronze medalists for Ecuador
South American Games medalists in judo
Competitors at the 2018 South American Games
Medalists at the 2015 Pan American Games
Judoka at the 2020 Summer Olympics
21st-century Ecuadorian women